Bahçeşehir University (BAU) is a private educational institution in Turkey, located around the Bosporus in Istanbul. The Turkish National Assembly authorized the establishment of the University of Bahçeşehir by the Bahçeşehir Uğur Education Foundation in 1998. An academic and strategic protocol was signed shortly after (February 1998) with San Diego State University in California, USA. The enrollment of the first students was made after the first placement exam (ÖSYS) in the 1999–2000 academic year. The university is one of the few universities in Turkey which has its lectures in English and therefore students applying to BAU are required to have high English proficiency.

The university consists of 8 faculties, 1 school of languages and 2 vocational schools. Four institutes provides post-graduate education. There are 17,048 registered students studying at the university. The number of undergraduate students is 10,137 and the number of graduate students is 4,716. The number of associate degree students is 1072. Some 1047 academicians lecture at the university and 506 administrative personnel work at the university. There are 4 campuses in Istanbul. Bahçeşehir University Library, which is established on a 1400-meter-square field renders service with 250,000 publications, books and electronic books. Five different café and restaurants render service on the campus. The total audience capacity of the conference hall is 1000.
 
Bahçeşehir University was given the "Superbrands of Turkey" award in 2007.

Bahçeşehir Uğur Educational Institutions own 35 kindergartens, 18 elementary and 47 high schools, and 177 private educational centers in Turkey.
The current rector is Prof. Dr. Şirin Karadeniz.

Rankings and international recognition 
It is considered one of the best privately owned universities in Turkey and is found on the list of top 10 Universities in Turkey.

The university has 7 campuses outside of Turkey. Two in the US (Washington DC and Boston), 1 in Canada (Toronto), 1 in Italy (Rome), 1 in Germany (Berlin), 1 in Georgia (Batumi) and 1 in China (Hong Kong).  
The university has more than 193 international partners and has cooperations with world-known universities like Harvard University (US).
It has six campuses in Istanbul.

Academic units

Faculty of Law 
Dean: Prof. Kadir Emre Gökyayla
 Faculty of Law

Faculty of Economics, Administrative and Social Sciences 
Dean: Prof. İpek Altınbaşak Farina
 American Culture and Literature
 European Union Relations
 Economics
 Economics and Finance
 Business Administration
 Logistic Management
 Political Science and International Relations
 International Finance
 International Trade
 Sociology
 Psychology

Faculty of Communication 
Dean: Prof. Hasan Kemal Suher
 Digital Game Design
 Photography and Video
 Communication Design
 Public Relations
 Advertising
 Cinema and Television
 New Media

Faculty of Architecture and Design 
Dean: Prof. Murat Dündar
 Architecture
 Interior Architecture and Environmental Design
 Industrial Product Design

Faculty of Engineering and Natural Sciences 
Dean: Prof. Yücel Batu Salman
 Computer Engineering
 Biomedical Engineering
 Industrial Engineering
 Electrical and Electronic Engineering
 Energy Systems Engineering
 Civil Engineering
 Molecular Biology and Genetics
 Management Engineering
 Mechatronics Engineering
 Mathematical Engineering
 Artificial Intelligence Engineering
 Software Engineering

Faculty of Health Sciences 
Dean: Prof. Gökay Görmeli
 Audiology
 Physiotherapy and Rehabilitation
 Occupational Therapy
 Nursing
 Nutrition and Dietetics
 Physiotherapy and Rehabilitation
 Management of Health Institutes

Faculty of Medicine 
Dean: Prof. Türker Kılıç
 Basic Sciences
 Clinical Medical Sciences
 Surgical Sciences

Graduate School of Natural and Applied Sciences 
Graduate Programs
 Actuarial Science
 Applied Mathematics
 Architecture
 Bioengineering
 Computer Engineering
 Cyber Security
 Electrical and Electronic Engineering
 Energy and Environment Management
 Energy Systems Operation and Technologies
 Engineering Management
 Industrial Engineering
 Information Technologies
 Interior Design
 Mechatronics Engineering
 Sound Technologies
 Supply Chain and Logistics Management
 Urban Systems and Transportation Management
Ph.D. Programs
 Computer Engineering
 Electrical and Electronic Engineering
 Industrial Engineering
 Mathematics
 History, Theory and Criticism in Design (Architecture)

Graduate School of Social Sciences 
Graduate Programs
 e-MBA / Distance Learning MBA
 Executive MBA
 Financial Economics
 Entrepreneurship and Innovation Management
 Global Affairs
 Advanced Acting
 Human Resources Management
 Public Law
 Clinical Psychology
 Global Affairs
 Global Business and Marketing
 Global Politics and International Relations
 MBA
 Accounting and International Reporting
 Game Design
 Private Law
 Marketing Communications and Public Relations
 Marketing
 Advertising and Brand Communication Management
 Capital Markets and Finance
 Capital Markets and Commercial Law
 Film and Television
 Sports Management
 Strategic Marketing and Brand Management
 History
 Distance Education Global Politics and International Relations
 Management Information Systems
Ph.D. Programs
 Economics and Finance
 Business Administration
 Public Law
 Private Law
 Advertising and Public Relations
 Cinema and Media Research
 Political Science and International Relations
Interior Design

Vocational School 
 Computer Programming
 Foreign Trade
 Mechatronics
 Maritime Transportation and Management
 Private Security and Protection

English Preparatory School

Bahçeşehir University's CO-OP Program 
CO-OP which stands for “Cooperative Education Program“ is an education model that integrates university and business life. CO-OP's purpose is to unify education and working life. Students continue to their education while gaining work experience with this model. There are 1500 local and 150 international partners in CO-OP.

Gallery

See also
 List of universities in Turkey

References

External links
Bahçeşehir University official web site
Bahçeşehir University Library
360° virtual tour of the Beşiktaş Campus
360° virtual tour of the Galata Campus
360° virtual tour of the Şişli Campus
Study in Turkey

 
Educational institutions established in 1998
Private universities and colleges in Turkey
1998 establishments in Turkey